Despised Icon is a Canadian deathcore band from Montreal, Quebec. Formed in 2002, the band is noted for the talent of its drummer, Alex Pelletier, who makes frequent use of the blasting technique, as well as for its dual lead vocalists; Alex Erian and Steve Marois. Erian makes use of a mid-range growl technique while Marois performs high-pitched fry shrieks, deeper growled vocals and pig squeals.

In April 2010, the band disbanded, but officially re-formed six years later in April 2016 after playing reunion shows in 2014 and 2015. Collectively the group has released six full-length albums while succumbing to very few lineup changes throughout their run.

History

Consumed by Your Poison (2002–2004) 
Despised Icon was founded in January 2002 in Montreal, Quebec, Canada. Shortly after their formation, the group signed with Galy Records, and released their debut album, Consumed by Your Poison in October of that year. The following year, Despised Icon had undergone several changes in their lineup. In early 2004, the group returned with a new formation, consisting of two vocalists Steve Marois and Alex Erian, guitarists Yannick St-Amand and Eric Jarrin, bassist Sebastien Piche, and drummer Alex Pelletier, and recorded a self-financed EP entitled Syndicated Murderers, followed by a split EP with Bodies in the Gears of the Apparatus, issued through Relapse Records.

The Healing Process (2005–2006) 
Despised Icon signed a worldwide deal with Century Media in January 2005. Despised Icon released their second studio album, The Healing Process through the label on April 5, 2005. It was produced by the band's guitarist Yannick St-Amand, mixed by Jean-Francois Dagenais and mastered by Alan Douches.

Despised Icon toured in support of The Healing Process in 2005, alongside artists including Cryptopsy, Quo Vadis, Vader, Suffocation, Aborted, Immolation, Deicide and continued touring into 2006 with Through the Eyes of the Dead, Ed Gein, Morbid Angel, Behemoth, Hatebreed, Exodus, The Black Dahlia Murder and Napalm Death.  During the same year, their debut album, Consumed by Your Poison was re-released through Century Media. In early 2007, they went on tour supporting Unearth, along with Job for a Cowboy and Dååth.

The Ills of Modern Man, Day of Mourning, and breakup (2007–2010) 
The band's third studio album, The Ills of Modern Man was recorded and released in 2007 through Century Media Records and was produced by their former guitarist, Yannick St. Amand. That summer, they toured supporting Job for a Cowboy along with The Faceless and A Life Once Lost. Following that tour, they went on tour supporting Suicide Silence, along with Winds of Plague. In the winter of that year, they toured with The Acacia Strain, Full Blown Chaos, The Tony Danza Tapdance Extravaganza, and Ligeia. They also toured supporting Misery Index, along with Beneath the Massacre and Man Must Die. On June 18, 2008, the original bassist Sebastien Piché has left the band due to him having a full-time job and being a new father. Piché was replaced by Max Lavelle from Goratory. They were then on the 2008 Summer Slaughter Tour alongside The Black Dahlia Murder, Vader, Cryptopsy, The Faceless, Aborted, Born of Osiris, Psycroptic, and Whitechapel.

In late October 2008, Despised Icon announced the details of their first DVD, entitled Montreal Assault, which was released January 27, 2009. The DVD features a multi-camera shoot from the band's sold-out hometown show, along with a documentary, in addition to all their music videos. It was originally intended to be released on January 17, but was delayed due to manufacturing problems. In December 2008, guitarist Al Glassman left Despised Icon to join Job for a Cowboy in replacement of their original guitarist Ravi Bhadriraju.
During their 2009 Montreal Assault Tour, Despised Icon announced that they were recording a new studio album, entitled Day of Mourning, that was released on September 22, 2009 by Century Media Records. On July 17, 2009, Despised Icon released their song, "MVP" as the first song off of Day of Mourning onto the web. They played on the 2009 Thrash and Burn Tour alongside DevilDriver, Emmure, Veil of Maya, For the Fallen Dreams, Oceano, Periphery, MyChildren MyBride, and Thy Will Be Done. Their fourth album Day of Mourning was released as scheduled on September 22, 2009, and reached No. 162 on the Billboard 200 as of September 30, 2009. A music video was created and released for the title track of the album.

On April 7, 2010, Despised Icon made an announcement that they will be disbanding. They
explained that this is due to the members of the band reaching "a new chapter in their lives, starting families, buying houses and pursuing other careers to make it all happen. Writing music, touring and leaving home for months at a time is slowly becoming impossible because of that. We all decided that it’d be best to pull the plug now and end things right." Their farewell European tour included an appearance at the Hevy Music Festival on August 7, 2010 near Folkestone, UK.

During the year of 2010, Despised Icon played their United States, Australia, Japan, European, and Canadian Tour. On December 2, 2010, Despised Icon performed their final four shows in Toronto (December 2 and 3) along with The Acacia Strain, Ion Dissonance and Oceano, Ontario and their hometown of Montreal, Quebec (December 4 and 5). These shows included their current line-up as well as the past line-ups from their first two records. Since the disbandment, Alexandre Erian went on to form the metalcore band, Obey the Brave, along with former Blind Witness bassist, Miguel Lepage, and guitarist, John Campbell as well as Darkness Rites guitarist, Greg Wood and drummer, Stevie Morotti. Max Lavelle now plays bass for The Black Dahlia Murder. Eric Jarrin rejoined his progressive band Heaven's Cry with whom he was performing when he founded Despised Icon. They released an album entitled Wheels of Impermanence through Prosthetic Records in September 2012.

Reunion shows, comeback and Beast (2014–2018)
On February 4, 2014, the band announced via their Facebook page that they would reunite to play several live shows in the upcoming spring. The band would consist of all members of The Healing Process era with the exception of Ben Landreville on guitar. Founding member Yannick St. Amand returned to handle the band's audio samples and live sound, thus making the group a septet for the first time.

In April 2014, they participated in the Impericon Festival Tour across Europe and also headlined a handful of shows with support from Brutality Will Prevail and Cerebral Bore. They also performed at Montebello's Amnesia Rockfest in Canada on June 20, 2014.

They closed the year 2014 with 4 North American concerts on the east coast, playing Montreal, Toronto, New York City and Worcester in December.

On April 6, 2015, the band announced via their Facebook page that to commemorate the 10 year anniversary of the release of their album The Healing Process, the band would be performing exclusive shows at U.K.'s Ghostfest and in Canada at Quebec City's Envol & Macadam Festival.

On April 12, 2016, the band announced via their Facebook page that after signing a deal with record label Nuclear Blast, they we're officially back as a permanent band. They released a short video with a snippet of unreleased material. Their fifth studio album titled Beast was released on July 22, 2016.

Purgatory and Déterré EP (2019–present)
On September 20, The band embarked on a massive North American tour to promote their upcoming album "Purgatory".

Their sixth full-length album, Purgatory, was released on November 15, 2019.

On October 28, 2022, the band released an EP titled Déterré, which consists of five old-school songs dating back to 2004.

Members
Current members
 Steve Marois – vocals (2002–2010, 2014–present)
 Alex Erian – vocals (2004–2010, 2014–present); drums (2002–2004)
 Eric Jarrin – lead guitar (2002–2010, 2014–present)
 Sebastien Piché – bass (2002–2008, 2014–present)
 Alex Pelletier – drums (2004–2010, 2014–present)
 Ben Landreville – rhythm guitar (2009–2010, 2014–present)

Former members
 Yannick St-Amand – samples, media (2002–2006, 2014–2019); rhythm guitar (2002–2006)
 Marie-Hélène Landry – vocals (2002–2003)
 Al Glassman – rhythm guitar (2006–2008)
 Max Lavelle (of The Black Dahlia Murder) – bass (2008–2010)

Timeline

Discography

Studio albums

DVDs

Other releases

Music videos

References

External links

Musical groups from Montreal
Musical groups established in 2002
Relapse Records artists
Century Media Records artists
Deathcore musical groups
English-language musical groups from Quebec
Musical groups disestablished in 2010
2002 establishments in Quebec
Musical groups reestablished in 2014